Circulating endothelial cells (CECs) are endothelial cells that have been shed from the lining of the vascular wall into the blood stream. Endothelial cells normally line blood vessels to maintain vascular integrity and permeability, but when these cells enter into the circulation, this could be a reflection of vascular dysfunction and damage. There are many factors involved in the process of creating CECs, including: reduced interaction between the endothelial cells and basement membrane proteins, damaged endothelial cellular adhesion molecules, mechanical injury, decreased survival of cytoskeletal proteins, and inflammation.

Endothelial progenitor cells (EPCs) are cells derived from the bone marrow which differentiate into endothelial cells to help support the vascular endothelium and create new blood vessels. EPCs are biomarkers of repair while CEC are biomarkers of damage. They can be distinguished by their different surface markers .

History 
Identification of CECs began in the 1970s. A key step in their investigation occurred in 1992 when monoclonal antibodies to surface CEC antigens were discovered, leading to novel markers of CECs.

Role in cardiovascular disease 
Prior to a myocardial infarction (MI or heart attack), plaque may accumulate in the coronary arteries, Some plaque formations may rupture, causing a mechanical dislodgment of endothelial cells creating CEC. The plaque that stays lodged in the coronary arteries may restrict blood flow to the cardiac muscle. This causes ischemia; the progressive death of cardiac muscle due to lack of oxygen. If the heart muscles have prolonged ischemia this may lead to the detachment of endocardial endothelial cells which can also create CEC.

Frequency 
Studies have reported that in healthy individuals CECs are often  at very low levels in the blood. Conversely, diseased individuals who suffer from cardiovascular problems, such as MIs, have elevated CEC levels found within the blood.
Using immunomagnetic separation or flow cytometry, CEC levels can be quantified. Although levels vary between individuals, a study observed a mean of 40.6 cell/ml in individuals who suffered a heart attack . In comparison, 0.4 cells/ ml were found in healthy individuals

Detection
The High-Definition Circulating Endothelial Cell (HD-CEC) assay is a novel fluid biopsy test which detects endothelial cells in the blood of patients who have recently suffered a heart attack. Though not yet approved by the FDA, this test has demonstrated better specificity than the FDA approved CellSearch test used to detect circulating tumour cells. CECs are known to express endothelial markers such as the blood glycoprotein von Willebrand factor (vWF) which is involved in platelet aggregation and adhesion,
CECs also express the cell surface protein CD146 which is the most commonly known endothelial marker found in CECs and plays an important role in permeability, cell-cell cohesion and signalling. CECs are identifiable through DAPI staining, a specialised method of DNA staining, and are absent of the hematopoietic marker CD45.  The HD-CEC assay identifies these markers based on reaction with specific antibodies as well as morphological characteristics of their cytoplasm and nuclei.

Research 
Further studies will use the HD-CEC test on patients who currently exhibit signs and symptoms of a heart attack but have not yet experienced one. Researchers are hoping that the HD-CEC test will be used to predict cardiovascular diseases such as acute MI, angina and heart failure  and analyze vascular damage.

References

Further reading 
 Goon, P.K.Y, Lip, G.Y.H., Boos, C.J., Stonelake, P.S., Blann, A.D. (2006) Circulating Endothelial Cells, Endothelial Progenitor Cells, and Endothelial Microparticles in Cancer. Neoplasia. 8: 79-88
 Koc, M., Rochards, H.B., Bihorac, A., Ross, E.A., Schold, J.D., Segal, M.S. (2005) Circulating endothelial cells are associated with future vascular events in haemodialysis patients. Kidney International. 67: 1078-1083
 Bethel, K., Luttgen, M.S., Damani, S., Kolatkar, A., Lamy, R., Sabouri-Ghomi, M., Topol, S., Topol, E.J., Kuhn, P. (2014) Fluid phase biopsy for detection and characterization of circulating endothelial cells in myocardial infarction. Physical Biology. 11: 016002
 Damani, S., et al. (2012) Characterization of Circulating Endothelial Cells in Acute Myocardial Infarction. Science Translational Medicine.4: 1-9
 Martinez-Sales, V., S´anchez-L´azaro, I., Vila, V., Almenar, L., Contreras, T., Reganon, E. (2011) Circulating endothelial cells in patients with heart failure and left ventricular dysfunction. Disease Markers. 31: 75-82
 Woywodt, A., Bahlmann, F.H., de Groot, K., Haller, H., Haubitz, M. (2002) Circulating endothelial cells: life, death, detachment and repair of the endothelial cell layer. Nephrol Dial Transplant. 17: 1728-1730
 Boos, C. J., Lip, G. Y. and Blann, A. D. (2006) Circulating endothelial cells in cardiovascular disease. J. Am. Coll. Cardiol. 48: 1538–1547
 Hill, J. M., Zalos, G., Halcox, J. P., Schenke, W. H., Waclawiw, M. A., Quyyumi, A. A., & Finkel, T. (2003). Circulating endothelial progenitor cells, vascular function, and cardiovascular risk. New England Journal of Medicine. 348: 593-600.
 Werner, N., Kosiol, S., Schiegl, T., Ahlers, P., Walenta, K., Link, A., ... & Nickenig, G. (2005). Circulating endothelial progenitor cells and cardiovascular outcomes. New England Journal of Medicine. 353: 999-1007.
 Blann, A. D., Woywodt, A., Bertolini, F., Bull, T. M., Buyon, J. P., Clancy, R. M., ... & Dignat-George, F. (2005). Circulating endothelial cells. Biomarker of vascular disease. Thromb Haemost. 93: 228-235.
 George, F., Brisson, C., Poncelet, P., Laurent, J.C., Massot, O., Arnoux, D., Ambrosi, P., Klein-Soyer, C., Cazenave, J.P., Sampol, J. (1992) Rapid isolation of human endothelial cells from whole blood using S-Endo 1 monoclonal antibody coupled to immunomagnetic beads: demonstration of endothelial injury after angioplasty. Thromb Haemost. 67:147–153.
 Davies, M. J., & Thomas, A. C. (1985). Plaque fissuring—the cause of acute myocardial infarction, sudden ischaemic death, and crescendo angina. British Heart Journal. 53: 363.
 Li, C., Wu, Q., Liu, B., Yao, Y., Chen, Y., Zhang, H.,& Ge, S. (2013). Detection and validation of circulating endothelial cells, a blood-based diagnostic marker of acute myocardial infarction. PLoS ONE, 8: e58478.
  Bouvier, C.A., Gaynor, E., Clintron, J.R. et al. (1970) Circulating endothelium as an indicator of vascular injury. Thromb Diath Haemorrh.  40:  163-168
 Mutin, M., Canavy, I., Blann, A., Bory, M., Sampol, J., & Dignat-George, F. (1999). Direct evidence of endothelial injury in acute myocardial infarction and unstable angina by demonstration of circulating endothelial cells. Blood 93: 2951-2958.
 Thygesen, K., Alpert, J. S., & White, H. D. (2007). Universal definition of myocardial infarction. Journal of the American College of Cardiology. 50: 2173-2195.
 Lüscher, T. F. (1993). The endothelium as a target and mediator of cardiovascular disease. European journal of clinical investigation. 23: 670-685.
 Ip, J. H., Fuster, V., Badimon, L., Badimon, J., Taubman, M. B., & Chesebro, J. H. (1990). Syndromes of accelerated atherosclerosis: role of vascular injury and smooth muscle cell proliferation. Journal of the American College of Cardiology. 15: 1667-1687.

Blood
Vascular diseases